Macaranga huahineensis is a species of plant in the family Euphorbiaceae. It is endemic to French Polynesia.

References

Flora of French Polynesia
huahineensis
Vulnerable plants
Taxonomy articles created by Polbot